Darren Morningstar (born April 22, 1969) is an American retired professional basketball player who was selected by the Boston Celtics in the second round (47th pick overall) of the 1992 NBA draft. A 6'10" and 325 lb center, Morningstar played in only one NBA season, splitting time with the Dallas Mavericks and Utah Jazz. He played collegiately at both the United States Naval Academy and at the University of Pittsburgh.

External links
Darren Morningstar's stats @ Basketball-reference.com

1969 births
Living people
American expatriate basketball people in Argentina
American expatriate basketball people in Italy
American expatriate basketball people in Spain
American men's basketball players
Basketball players from Washington (state)
Bàsquet Manresa players
Boston Celtics draft picks
Capitanes de Arecibo players
CB Murcia players
Centers (basketball)
Dallas Mavericks players
Grand Rapids Hoops players
Fargo-Moorhead Fever players
Liga ACB players
Navy Midshipmen men's basketball players
Pallacanestro Petrarca Padova players
People from Skamania County, Washington
Pittsburgh Panthers men's basketball players
Rapid City Thrillers players
Sportspeople from the Portland metropolitan area
Utah Jazz players
United States Basketball League coaches